Operation Rana Gosa, (battle cry in Sinhala), was an operation fought during the Sri Lankan Civil War as part of Eelam War III launched on 4 March 1999. The Operation resulted in the Sri Lankan Army re-capturing of 535 square kilometres of territory previously occupied by the LTTE.

See also
 List of Sri Lankan Civil War battles

References

External links
 'Operation battle cry' amidst cry for peace
 Now, an artillery war
 Did LTTE misjudge Op. Rana Gosa II advance?
 Rana Gosa V disaster bares Tiger build-up
 SRI LANKA-update no.6.  Rana gosa III & IV
 MADU RESCUED

Rana Gosa
1999 in Sri Lanka
Rana Gosa